The denarius (dēnāriī ) was the standard Roman silver coin from its introduction in the Second Punic War  to the reign of Gordian III (AD 238–244), when it was gradually replaced by the antoninianus. It continued to be minted in very small quantities, likely for ceremonial purposes, until and through the Tetrarchy (293–313).

The word dēnārius is derived from the Latin dēnī "containing ten", as its value was originally of 10 assēs. The word for "money" descends from it in Italian (denaro), Slovene (denar), Portuguese (dinheiro), and Spanish (dinero). Its name also survives in the dinar currency.

Its symbol is represented in Unicode as 𐆖 (U+10196), a numeral monogram that appeared on the obverse in the Republican period, denoting the 10 asses ("X") to 1 denarius ("I") conversion rate. However it can also be represented as X̶ (capital letter X with combining long stroke overlay).

History

Contact with the Greeks had prompted a need for silver coinage in addition to the bronze currency that the Romans were using at that time. This predecessor of the denarius was a Greek-styled silver coin of didrachm weight, which was struck in Neapolis and other Greek cities in southern Italy. These coins were inscribed with a legend that indicated that they were struck for Rome, but in style they closely resembled their Greek counterparts. They were rarely seen at Rome, to judge from finds and hoards, and were probably used either to buy supplies or pay soldiers.

The first distinctively Roman silver coin appeared around 226 BC. Classical historians have sometimes called these coins "heavy denarii", but they are classified by modern numismatists as quadrigati, a term which survives in one or two ancient texts and is derived from the quadriga, or four-horse chariot, on the reverse,. This, with a two-horse chariot or biga which was used as a reverse type for some early denarii, was the prototype for the most common designs used on Roman silver coins for a number of years.

Rome overhauled its coinage shortly before 211 BC, and introduced the denarius alongside a short-lived denomination called the victoriatus. It formed the backbone of Roman currency throughout the Roman Republic and the early Empire.

The denarius began to undergo slow debasement toward the end of the republican period. Debasement of the coin's silver content continued after Nero. Later Roman emperors also reduced its weight to 3 grams around the late 3rd century.

The value at its introduction was 10 asses, giving the denarius its name, which translates as "containing ten". In about 141 BC, it was re-tariffed at 16 asses, to reflect the decrease in weight of the as. The denarius continued to be the main coin of the Roman Empire until it was replaced by the antoninianus in the early 3rd century AD. The coin was last issued, in bronze, under Aurelian between AD 270 and 275, and in the first years of the reign of Diocletian. ('Denarius', in A Dictionary of Ancient Roman Coins, by John R. Melville-Jones (1990)).

Debasement and evolution

Value, comparisons and silver content

1 gold aureus = 2 gold quinarii = 25 silver denarii = 50 silver quinarii = 100 bronze sestertii = 200 bronze dupondii = 400 copper asses = 800 copper semisses = 1,600 copper quadrantes

It is difficult to give even rough comparative values for money from before the 20th century, as the range of products and services available for purchase was so different. During the republic (509 BC–27 BC), a legionary earned 112.5 denarii per year (0.3 denarii per day). Under Julius Caesar, this was doubled to 225 denarii/yr, with soldiers having to pay for their own food and arms, while in the reign of Augustus a Centurion received at least 3,750 denarii per year, and for the highest rank, 15,000 denarii.

By the late Roman Republic and early Roman Empire, a common soldier or unskilled laborer would be paid 1 denarius/day (with no tax deductions), around 300% inflation compared to the early period. Using the cost of bread as a baseline, this pay equates to around US$20 in 2013 terms. Expressed in terms of the price of silver, and assuming 0.999 purity, a  troy ounce denarius had a precious metal value of around US$2.60 in 2021.

At the height of the Roman Empire a sextarius (546ml or about 2 1/4 cups) of ordinary wine cost roughly one Dupondius (⅛ of a Denarius), after Diocletian's Edict on Maximum Prices were issued in AD 301, the same item cost 8 debased common denarii – 6,400% inflation.

Silver content plummeted across the lifespan of the denarius. Under the Roman Empire (after Nero) the denarius contained approximately 50 grains, 3.24 grams, or  (0.105ozt) troy ounce. The fineness of the silver content varied with political and economic circumstances. From a purity of greater than 90% silver in the 1st century AD, the denarius fell to under 60% purity by AD 200, and plummeted to 5% purity by AD 300. By the reign of Gallienus, the antoninianus was a copper coin with a thin silver wash.

Influence
In the final years of the 1st century BC Tincomarus, a local ruler in southern Britain, started issuing coins that appear to have been made from melted down denarii. The coins of Eppillus, issued around Calleva Atrebatum around the same time, appear to have derived design elements from various denarii such as those of Augustus and M. Volteius.

Even after the denarius was no longer regularly issued, it continued to be used as a unit of account, and the name was applied to later Roman coins in a way that is not understood. The Arabs who conquered large parts of the land that once belonged to the Eastern Roman Empire issued their own gold dinar. The lasting legacy of the denarius can be seen in the use of "d" as the abbreviation for the British penny until 1971. It also survived in France as the name of a coin, the denier. The denarius also survives in the common Arabic name for a currency unit, the dinar used from pre-Islamic times, and still used in several modern Arab nations. The major currency unit in former Principality of Serbia, Kingdom of Serbia and former Yugoslavia was dinar, and it is still used in present-day Serbia. The Macedonian currency denar is also derived from the Roman denarius. The Italian word denaro, the Spanish word dinero, the Portuguese word dinheiro, and the Slovene word , all meaning money, are also derived from Latin denarius. The pre-decimal currency of the United Kingdom until 1970 of pounds, shillings and pence was abbreviated as lsd, with "d" referring to denarius and standing for penny.

Use in the Bible
In the New Testament, the gospels refer to the denarius as a day's wage for a common laborer (Matthew 20:2, John  12:5). In the Book of Revelation, during the Third Seal: Black Horse, a choinix ("quart") of wheat and three quarts of barley were each valued at one denarius. Bible scholar Robert H. Mounce says the price of the wheat and barley as described in the vision appears to be ten to twelve times their normal cost in ancient times. Revelation thus describes a condition where basic goods are sold at greatly inflated prices. Thus, the black horse rider depicts times of deep scarcity or famine, but not of starvation. Apparently, a choinix of wheat was the daily ration of one adult. Thus, in the conditions pictured by Revelation 6, the normal income for a working-class family would buy enough food for only one person. The less costly barley would feed three people for one day's wages.

The denarius is also mentioned in the Parable of the Good Samaritan (Luke 10:25–37). The Render unto Caesar passage in Matthew 22:15–22 and Mark 12:13–17 uses the word (δηνάριον) to describe the coin held up by Jesus, translated in the King James Bible as "tribute penny". It is commonly thought to be a denarius with the head of Tiberius.

See also

Denarius of L. Censorinus, for the detailed description of a specific Roman denarius
Dupondius
French denier
Gold Dinar
Ides of March Coin
Macedonian denar
Sestertius
Solidus (coin)
Tribute penny

Notes

References

External links

Denarius
From Octavian to Augustus: Images Illustrating His Rise to Power
Denarius – A Roman soldier's daily pay

Coins of ancient Rome
Coins in the Bible
New Testament Latin words and phrases
Numismatics
Silver coins